Love Is Just a Fairytale is a 1955 West German musical comedy film directed by Arthur Maria Rabenalt and starring Willy Fritsch, Georges Guétary and Claude Farell.

The film's sets were designed by the art director Hans Kuhnert. It was made at the Tempelhof Studios in Berlin and on location around Athens. It was shot in Agfacolor.

Cast

References

Bibliography

External links 
 

1955 films
1955 musical comedy films
German musical comedy films
West German films
1950s German-language films
Films directed by Arthur Maria Rabenalt
Constantin Film films
Films shot in Greece
Films set in Athens
Films shot at Tempelhof Studios
1950s German films